Aljoša Štefanič (born 2 February 1982 in Slovenj Gradec) is a Slovenian professional handball player.

Career
Štefanič played for Gorenje Velenje, Gorišnica, Jeruzalem Ormož, Gold Club, and Maribor Branik.

References
 

1982 births
Living people
Sportspeople from Slovenj Gradec
Slovenian male handball players
21st-century Slovenian people